Train is a South Korean television series starring Yoon Shi-yoon, Kyung Soo-jin and Shin So-yul. It aired on OCN from July 11 to August 17, 2020, every Saturday and Sunday at 22:30 (KST).

Synopsis
A hard-hitting detective who fearlessly dives into his work, Seo Do-won (Yoon Shi-yoon) is relentless when it comes to bringing criminals to justice. Willing to take on any case, no matter how hard, Do-won has made a name for himself as a man who gets the job done. But when the woman he loves becomes the latest victim of a serial killer, his world completely changes.

Mysteriously able to move between parallel universes, Do-won now lives in both worlds as a man who must pay for the sins of his father in one, and as a man forced to live a precarious life because of those sins in the other. As if the duality of his life wasn't hard enough to deal with, he soon learns that his deceased love may be gone in one world, but she's very much alive in the other. Vowing to track down her killer in one universe, while simultaneously trying to protect her in the other, Do-won is quick to acknowledge this is not something he can do alone.

Seeking the help of his colleagues in both universes, Do-won asks Han Seo-kyung (Kyung Soo-jin), an honest, yet reserved prosecutor with a big heart in one world, and a cold and emotionless detective in the other, to help him out. Together with Lee Jung-min (Shin So-yul), a tenacious member of the scientific investigation unit, they'll do whatever it takes to track down the killer in one world and protect his love in the other.

Cast

Main
 Yoon Shi-yoon as Seo Do-won
 Lee Min-jae as young Seo Do-won
 A police officer on the path of atonement in universe "A" and a senior police inspector who has chosen the path of corruption in universe "B".
 Kyung Soo-jin as Han Seo-kyung
 Im Chae-hyun  as young Han Seo-kyung
 An honest, straight-talking prosecutor in universe "A" and a cold, emotionless detective in universe "B". She searches for the truth after finding out about the death of her father.
 Shin So-yul as Lee Jung-min
 A forensic inspector in both universes but Do-won's best friend in universe "A" and Do-won's first love and ex-girlfriend in universe "B".

Supporting
 Lee Hang-na as Oh Mi-sook
 Police chief who took care of Do-won and Seo-kyung in universe "A". A police chief with hidden agenda in universe "B".
 Choi Seung Yoon as Dr. Seok Min Joon 
 A psychiatrist in universe "B" who treats Seo-kyung.
 Jo Wan-ki as Woo Jae-hyuk 
 A detective in Do-won's team in both universes.
 Kim Dong-young as Kim Jin-woo
 A detective in Do-won's team in universe "A" and an ex-convict in universe "B".
 Baek Jae-woo as Kang Joon-young
 A junior detective in Do-won's team in universe "B".

Han Seo-kyung's family 
 Kim Jin-seo as Han Kyu-tae Seo-kyung's father and the murder victim.
 Cha Yup as Lee Sung-wook
 Kim Yoo-chan as young Lee Sung-wook
 Han Seo-kyung's disabled step-brother in universe "A" and a gang member in universe "B".

 Yoon Bok-in as Jo Young-ran  Seo-kyung's step-mother and Sung-wook mother.

Seo Do-won's family 

 Nam Moon-cheol as Seo Jae-cheol
 Do-won's father who died in universe "A" and is alive and convicted of Han Kyu-tae's murder in universe "B".

Others 

 Kwon Han-sol as Lee Ji-young
 Jang Yool as Park Tae-kyung
 Kim Bi-bi as NFS examiner
 Park Jung-won as Park Min-kyung
 Jang Hae-song as Lee Jin-sung

Viewership

International broadcast
The series is available on iQIYI with multi-languages subtitles in South East Asia and Taiwan, Rakuten Viki in selected regions, and in the United Kingdom and Republic of Ireland via Sky Sci-fi and NOW.

References

External links
  
 
 
 Train on iQIYI

OCN television dramas
Korean-language television shows
2020 South Korean television series debuts
2020 South Korean television series endings
South Korean fantasy television series
South Korean mystery television series
South Korean thriller television series
Television series about parallel universes
Television series by Studio Dragon